Caroline Di Cocco is a former politician in Ontario, Canada. She was a member of the Legislative Assembly of Ontario representing the riding of Sarnia—Lambton for the Ontario Liberal Party from 1999 to 2007 and was a cabinet minister in the government of Dalton McGuinty until her defeat in the 2007 provincial election.

Background
Di Cocco was born in Fontechiari, in Frosinone, Italy, and moved to Canada at a young age. She was educated at the Royal Conservatory of Music, and worked as a music teacher before entering political life.

She is also the author of a work entitled One By One ... Passo Dopo Passo, chronicling the history of the Italian community in Sarnia from 1870 to 1990.

In 1989, she founded the International Wine Gala.

Politics
Di Cocco served as a city councillor for Sarnia City Council from 1997 to 1999. She was elected to the Ontario legislature in the Ontario general election of 1999, defeating incumbent Progressive Conservative Dave Boushy by almost 3000 votes in Sarnia—Lambton. The Progressive Conservatives won the election, and Di Cocco served as her party's critic for Culture, Recreation and Heritage for the next four years. She also became known for her promotion of local environmental issues. In 2002, she was awarded a knighthood (Cavalieri) by the Republic of Italy.

She was easily re-elected in the provincial election of 2003, defeating Tory candidate and private-school promoter Henk Vanden Ende by over 6000 votes. She was appointed Parliamentary Assistant to Michael Bryant in his capacity as Minister responsible for Democratic Renewal on October 23, 2003. On September 27, 2004, she was named Parliamentary Assistant to Marie Bountrogianni in her capacity as Minister of Children and Youth Services.

Di Cocco was appointed to cabinet on April 5, 2006, replacing Madeleine Meilleur as Minister of Culture.

In the 2007 provincial election, Di Cocco was defeated by Progressive Conservative candidate Bob Bailey.

Cabinet positions

Electoral record

Swing:

Swing: 4.80 from PC to Lib (Lib hold)

Swing: 12.73 from Lib to PC (PC gain)

References

External links
 

Women government ministers of Canada
Italian emigrants to Canada
Living people
Members of the Executive Council of Ontario
Ontario Liberal Party MPPs
Women MPPs in Ontario
People from the Province of Frosinone
Sarnia city councillors
Year of birth missing (living people)
Women municipal councillors in Canada
21st-century Canadian politicians
21st-century Canadian women politicians